Shereen Usdin was born in Durban (South Africa), on 8 April 1962. She graduated as a medical doctor from the University of Witwatersrand (Johannesburg) in 1985. In 1995 she attained a Masters of Public Health, at Harvard University. She is a founding member of the South-African Soul City Institute for Health and Development Communication, now the Soul City Institute of Social Justice. She is active in the fields of Sexual and Reproductive Health and Rights, violence against women and health and human rights.

Published work
She contributed to numerous books and also wrote numerous papers and journal articles. She authored the No Nonsense Guide to HIV/AIDS, and the "No Nonsense Guide to World Health (Verso Press/New Internationalist).

References

External links
 Interview with Shereen Usdin

1962 births
Living people
Writers from Durban
University of the Witwatersrand alumni
South African women writers
HIV/AIDS in South Africa
Violence against women in South Africa
South African human rights activists
Harvard School of Public Health alumni